Western Head is a community in the Canadian province of Nova Scotia, located in the Region of Queens Municipality. The Meteorological Service of Canada maintains a weather station in Western Head ID: CWWE.

Western Head is prone to tropical storms and hurricanes that track up the East Coast. However, effects are usually quick and minimal as the cool waters may weaken the storm, and storms usually move very quickly across Western Head. For example, Hurricane Earl made landfall near Western Head as a large Category One hurricane in 2010.

References
Western Head on Destination Nova Scotia

Communities in the Region of Queens Municipality
Meteorological stations
General Service Areas in Nova Scotia